Señorita República Dominicana 1957 was held on March 9, 1957. The pageant had 24 delegates that represented their provinces. The delegates had to be born in the province they represented. The pageant was held at federal palace.  The competition was intro and dresses. Then in the top 10, they start with the evening gown, swim suit and at the top 5 they answer questions, all in the same order. The winner would be in luxury in the city of San Felipe de Puerto Plata. The original pageant was in 1928 where they would crown a delegate from a province. It canceled in 1930 when Trujillo became leader.

Results
 Señorita República Dominicana 1957: Belgica Margarita Mota de la Cruz (Pedernales)
 1st Runner-up: Silvana Medina (Séibo)
 2nd Runner-up: Ada Reynosa (Baoruco)
 3rd Runner-up: Soraida Cruz (Santiago Rodríguez)
 4th Runner-up: Sandra Batista (Benefactor)

Top 10
 María López (Libertador)
 Viviana Núñez (Santiago)
 Ana Méndez (Monte Cristi)
 Ericka Tavarez (Distrito Nacional)
 Isabela García (Puerto Plata)

Delegates

 Azua - Reyna Alcantara Savoy
 Baoruco - Ada Reynosa Espinal
 Barahona - Alma Rosa Fiallo Tosado
 Benefactor - Sandra Batista Veron
 Colón - Gemma Hidalgo Cormaron
 Distrito Nacional - Ericka María Tavarez Suarez
 Duarte - Isabel Germoso Duran
 Espaillat - Laura Cartagena de la Torres
 José Trujillo Valdez - Diana Henriqueta Mena Tenerife
 La Altagracia - Mayra Agnes Collado Ferro
 La Vega - Elizabeth Zamora Sandrano
 Libertador - María Caridad López Herrera
 Monte Cristi - Ana María Méndez Cruz
 Provincia de Jarabacoa - Anaida Tatiana Múñoz Múñoz
 Pedernales - Belgica Margarita Mota de la Cruz
 Puerto Plata - Isabela del Carmen García Altamirano
 Salcedo - Nadia Gúzman de Aroyo
 Samaná - Yoneidys Almeida de la Rosa
 San Pedro de Macorís - Silvia Oviedo Zaragoza
 San Rafael - Amparo Tatis Xavier
 Santiago - Viviana Victoria Núñez Camacho
 Santiago Rodríguez - Soraida Cruz Wilton
 Séibo - Silvana Aurora Medina Espinoza
 Trujillo - Oneidys Ramos Acosta

References

Miss Dominican Republic
1957 beauty pageants
1957 in the Dominican Republic